, literally "Carefully I Love You!", is the 4th single by Japanese idol girl group HKT48. It was released on September 24, 2014. It debuted in number one on the weekly Oricon Singles Chart and reached number one on the Billboard Japan Hot 100. As of October 20, 2014 (issue date), it has sold a total of 290,044 copies. It was the best-selling single in Japan in September 2014. It was the 21st best-selling single of the year in Japan, with 308,251 copies.

Track listing 
Sources:

Type A

Type B

Type C

Theater Edition

References

External links 
  

2014 singles
2014 songs
Japanese-language songs
HKT48 songs
Oricon Weekly number-one singles
Billboard Japan Hot 100 number-one singles